The Lives of Children is a book by George Dennison about the First Street School, a small, alternative mini-school on the Lower East Side of New York City. The school had no administrators, four teachers, and 23 students of integrated racial background. The author establishes a philosophy of education and concept for future schools based on his experiences teaching there.

References

External links 

 

1969 non-fiction books
Books about education
Random House books
English-language books
American non-fiction books